The Minister of Social Affairs, Health, Care and Consumer Protection heads the Federal Ministry of Social Affairs, Health, Care and Consumer Protection.

List

First Republic

Second Republic

Notes

References

Lists of government ministers of Austria